437 Transport Squadron is a unit of the Canadian Armed Forces under the Royal Canadian Air Force, based at CFB Trenton in Ontario. The unit operates the CC-150 Polaris, and is responsible for long range military and VIP transportation (including for the Royal Family visiting Canada).

History
437 Squadron was formed at RAF Blakehill Farm in Wiltshire, England in September 1944 as a unit of the Royal Canadian Air Force, and provided general transport until it was disbanded in June 1946. During this time the squadron flew Douglas Dakota (Mk.III and IV) aircraft. The Squadron saw active duty in glider towing and airdrops in the Battle of Arnhem (Operation Market Garden) and in the Crossing of the Rhine (Operation Varsity). Details, including a list of wartime personnel, can be found with this reference 

The squadron was reformed at CFB Trenton in 1961 and equipped with CC-106 Yukon. It was re-equipped with the CC-137 Husky (Boeing 707) in 1972. While operating the Husky it provided Air to Air Refueling in addition to transport services. Two aircraft out of the fleet of five were modified to serve as refueling tankers in mid 1972 to meet a requirement to support the CF-5 tactical fighter.

At the end of the useful life of the B707 in 1997, 437 Squadron was equipped with Airbus A-310 aircraft which are in use still to this day in both the VVIP transport and air to air refueling rolls.

Operations
437 Transport Squadron frequently supports government dignitaries while on official visits, including the Prime Minister of Canada and Charles III, King of Canada during Royal tours of Canada.   In June and July 2011 the squadron provided transportation for the Duke and Duchess of Cambridge as they toured Canada and the United States.

The squadron currently operates the CC-150 Polaris, a modified version of the Airbus A310. Three are configured for personnel and material transport, while two were reconfigured into the aerial refueling role.

Two CC-150 air-to-air refueling tankers were deployed to support Operation MOBILE during the 2011 military intervention in Libya. Canadian CF-188 fighter jets that enforce the no-fly zone over Libya under Operation Odyssey Dawn and Operation Unified Protector were refueled by 437 Sqn.

References

External links

Royal Canadian Air Force squadrons
Canadian Forces aircraft squadrons
Air transport of heads of state
Air force transport units and formations